The Fonz and the Happy Days Gang is an American animated science fiction comedy series produced by Hanna-Barbera Productions and Paramount Television and originally broadcast during the Saturday morning schedule on ABC from November 8, 1980, until November 28, 1981. It is a spin-off of the live-action sitcom Happy Days.

Premise 
Henry Winkler (The Fonz/ "Fonzie"), Ron Howard (Richie Cunningham), and Donny Most (Ralph Malph) all reprised their respective roles for The Fonz and the Happy Days Gang.

The series focuses on Fonzie, joined by an anthropomorphic dog named Mr. Cool, and his friends as they are visited by Cupcake, a girl from the future who pilots a malfunctioning time machine. After Fonzie repairs the machine, a subsequent accident causes the group to become missing in time. The series focuses on Fonzie and his friends as they land in various periods in time, attempting to return to their own. The introduction to the series was narrated by Wolfman Jack.

Twenty-four episodes were produced. After the series ended, the characters of Fonzie and Mr. Cool were introduced in the series Laverne & Shirley in the Army, which premiered October 10, 1981. The series was subsequently renamed Laverne & Shirley with The Fonz and depicted Fonzie working in the motorpool as the chief mechanic. That series ran until September 3, 1983. Both series were syndicated with an animated spin-off of the series Mork & Mindy as Mork & Mindy/Laverne & Shirley/Fonz Hour.

Cast 
 Henry Winkler as Arthur "The Fonz" Fonzarelli
 Ron Howard as Richie Cunningham
 Donny Most as Ralph Malph
 Frank Welker as Mr. Cool
 Didi Conn as Cupcake
 Wolfman Jack as opening narrator

Home media 
On November 5, 2019, the complete series was released as a made-on-demand DVD-R by CBS Home Entertainment and Paramount Home Entertainment.

Episodes

Season 1 (1980–81)

Season 2 (1981)

See also 
 List of animated spin-offs from prime time shows

References

External links 
 

1980 American television series debuts
1982 American television series endings
1980s American animated comedy television series
1980s American comic science fiction television series
American Broadcasting Company original programming
American animated television spin-offs
American children's animated adventure television series
American children's animated comic science fiction television series
Happy Days
Television series by CBS Studios
Television series by Hanna-Barbera
American time travel television series
1980s American time travel television series